Gerdeh Rash may refer to:
 Gerdeh Rash, Mahabad
 Gerdeh Rash, Miandoab